Emilio Lledó Íñigo (Seville, 5 November 1927) is a Spanish philosopher. He has been a professor at several universities and is a member of the Royal Spanish Academy.

Career
He took his bachelor's degree at the Instituto de Bachillerato Cervantes and, in 1952, his degree in philosophy at the Complutense University of Madrid. He went to Germany to continue his studies in classical philosophy with Hans-Georg Gadamer, who helped him to finish his doctoral thesis by securing him a scholarship from the Alexander von Humboldt Foundation. In 1955, he obtained a position at the Complutense University of Madrid, but returned to Germany after his marriage in 1958 because Gadamer, who was then a Dean of the faculty at the University of Heidelberg, had offered him a position there.

In 1962, he again returned to Spain, taking a job as an instructor at the Instituto Núñez de Arce in Valladolid. After two years, he obtained a chair at the University of La Laguna. Shortly thereafter, in 1967, he moved to the University of Barcelona, where he had been given the chair in Philosophy. In 1978, he moved again, to the National University of Distance Education (UNED), where he remained until his retirement.

Lledó was elected to Seat l of the Real Academia Española on 11 November 1993, he took up his seat on 27 November 1994.

Philosophical thought
According to Lledó, the history of philosophy should be understood as a form of "collective memory", embracing mankind's total development, that can be structured through three main elements:
 Classical Greek philosophy, with special attention to the Platonic dialogues and Aristotelian ethics as well as Epicureanism.
 Attention to language as the principal object of philosophical analysis; which clearly converges in the development of the main currents of post-war European thought.
 Elaborating fully a consideration of temporality and writing that will lead to a "philosophy of memory" and a textual anthropology, from hermeneutic roots.

Selected works
 Filosofía y Lenguaje, Ariel (1970)
La Memoria del Logos, Taurus (1984) 
 Memoria de la Ética, Taurus (1994) 
 El Silencio de la Escritura, Espasa (1998) 
 El Surco del Tiempo: Meditaciones Sobre el Mito Platónico de la Escritura y la Memoria, Crítica (2000) 
 Elogio de la infelicidad, Cuatro (2005) 
Ser Quien Eres: Ensayos para una Educación Democrática , University of Zaragoza (2009) 
 Lenguaje e Historia, Dykinson (2011) 
 El Epicureísmo, Taurus (2011) 
La Filosofía, Hoy, RBA (2012) 
 Los Libros y la Libertad, RBA (2013) .
 Palabra y humanidad, KRK (2015).
 Pensar es conversar. Diálogo entre filósofos, with Manuel Cruz, RBA (2015).
 Fidelidad a Grecia, Cuatro (2015) .

Honors and awards
 Life member of the Institute for Advanced Study, Berlin (1988)
 Elected to the Royal Spanish Academy (1993)
 Menéndez Pelayo International Prize (2004)
 Order of Merit of the Federal Republic of Germany (2005)
 Lázaro Carreter Prize, from the Germán Sánchez Ruipérez Foundation (2007)
 A library has been named after him in Salteras, his parents' hometown.

References

Further reading
 Esteban Ortega, Joaquín. Emilio Lledó : Una Filosofía de la Memoria, San Esteban (1997)

External links
 Fundación Juan March:Emilio Lledó en diálogo con Manuel Cruz
 CanalSur Andalucía: Emilio Lledó and Remedios Cervantes (1001 Noches)
 El País: Archive of articles by Emilio Lledó

Spanish philosophers
Academic staff of the Complutense University of Madrid
Heidelberg University alumni
Members of the Royal Spanish Academy
1927 births
Living people
Recipients of the Order of Merit of the Federal Republic of Germany
Academic staff of Heidelberg University
Academic staff of the University of La Laguna
Academic staff of the University of Barcelona
Academic staff of the National University of Distance Education